Lambda Geminorum, Latinized from λ Geminorum, is a candidate multiple star system in the constellation Gemini. It is visible to the naked eye at night with a combined apparent visual magnitude of 3.57. The distance to this system is 101 light years based on parallax, and it is drifting closer with a radial velocity of –7.4 km/s. It is a member of what is suspected to be a trailing tidal tail of the Hyades Stream.

Components A and B of this system form a wide binary. The primary was identified as a spectroscopic binary by E. B. Frost in 1924.

The primary, designated component A, typically has been assigned a stellar classification of A3V, which indicates this is an A-type main-sequence star that generates energy from core hydrogen fusion. However, in 1970 D. C. Barry classed it as A4IV, suggesting this may be a subgiant star that has begun evolving into a giant star. It was catalogued a suspected variable star, but is now confirmed as constant.

This star is less than a billion years in age with a rapid spin, showing a projected rotational velocity of 154 km/s It is larger and hotter than the Sun, with twice the Sun's mass and 2.8 times the radius of the Sun. The star is radiating 27 times the Sun's luminosity from its photosphere at an effective temperature of 7,932 K.

The primary displays a significant infrared excess in the K-band, which indicates an orbiting circumstellar disk of dust.

References 

A-type main-sequence stars
Circumstellar disks
Triple star systems

Gemini (constellation)
Geminorum, Lambda
Durchmusterung objects
Geminorum, 54
056537
035350
2763